The  was promulgated on 6 April 1868 in Kyoto Imperial Palace. The Oath outlined the main aims and the course of action to be followed during Emperor Meiji's reign, setting the legal stage for Japan's modernization. This also set up a process of urbanization as people of all classes were free to move jobs so people went to the city for better work. It remained influential, if less for governing than inspiring, throughout the Meiji era and into the twentieth century, and can be considered  the first constitution of modern Japan.

Rules
As the name implies, the text of the Oath consists of five clauses:

Origin and subsequent influence
The first draft of the Oath was written by junior councilor Yuri Kimimasa in January 1868, containing progressive language that spoke to the frustrations that the radical but modestly born Meiji leaders had experienced in "service to hereditary incompetents." Yuri's language was moderated by his colleague Fukuoka Takachika in February to be "less alarming," and Kido Takayoshi prepared the final form of the Oath, employing "language broad enough to embrace both readings." The Oath was read aloud by Sanjō Sanetomi in the main ceremonial hall of the Kyoto Imperial Palace in the presence of the Emperor and more than 400 officials. After the reading, the nobles and daimyōs present signed their names to a document praising the Oath, and swearing to do their utmost to uphold and implement it. Those not able to attend the formal reading afterwards visited the palace to sign their names, bringing the total number of signatures to 767.

The purpose of the oath was both to issue a statement of policy to be followed by the post-Tokugawa shogunate government in the Meiji period, and to offer hope of inclusion in the next regime to pro-Tokugawa domains. This second motivation was especially important in the early stages of the Restoration as a means to keep domains from joining the Tokugawa remnant in the Boshin War. Later, military victory "made it safe to begin to push court nobles and daimyō figureheads out of the way".

The promise of reform in the document initially went unfulfilled: in particular, a parliament with real power was not established until 1890, and the Meiji oligarchy from Satsuma, Chōshū, Tosa and Hizen retained political and military control well into the 20th century. In general, the Oath was purposely phrased in broad terms to minimize resistance from the daimyōs and to provide "a promise of gradualism and equity":

The Oath was reiterated as the first article of the constitution promulgated in June 1868, and the subsequent articles of that constitution expand the policies outlined in the Oath. Almost eighty years later, in the wake of the Second World War, Emperor Hirohito paid homage to the Oath and reaffirmed it as the basis of "national polity" in his Humanity Declaration. The ostensible purpose of the rescript was to appease the American occupiers with a renunciation of imperial divinity, but the emperor himself saw it as a statement of the existence of democracy in Meiji era.

See also
 Five Public Notices
 Seventeen-article constitution

Notes

References
 
 
 Jansen, Marius B.  (2000). The Making of Modern Japan. Cambridge: Harvard University Press. ;  OCLC 44090600
 Keene, Donald (2002). Emperor of Japan: Meiji and His World, 1852-1912. New York: Columbia University Press. ; OCLC 46731178

Further reading
 
 
 
 Breen, John, "The Imperial Oath of April 1868: ritual, power and politics in Restoration Japan," Monumenta Nipponica, 51, 4 (1996)
 
 

Meiji Restoration
Emperor Meiji
Defunct constitutions
1868 in Japan
Oaths